Pedro Ngueve Jonatão "Tito" Chingunji served as the foreign secretary of Angola's The National Union for the Total Independence of Angola (UNITA) rebel movement in the 1980s and early 1990s. In the mid-1980s, he was UNITA's representative in Washington, D.C.

Death
Chingunji was murdered in Angola in 1991 under circumstances still not fully understood. Some blamed his murder on UNITA leader Jonas Savimbi, who purportedly viewed Chingunji as a political threat. Fred Bridgland  Savimbi's biographer and longtime supporter claimed that between 60 and 70 of Chingunji's relatives were killed following his own execution, including his own children who were swung against trees. Savimbi, however, suggested his killing was more likely the work of UNITA dissidents or the Central Intelligence Agency, which, Savimbi argued, had supported Chingunji in an effort to overthrow him.

References

External links
"Jonas Savimbi denounced as a "murderous dictator" Angola: Peace monitor V. 5

1990s murders in Angola
1991 crimes in Angola
1991 deaths
1991 murders in Africa
20th-century Angolan people
Angolan anti-communists
Angolan rebels
Assassinated Angolan politicians
Members of UNITA
People murdered in Angola
UNITA politicians
Unsolved murders in Angola
Year of birth missing